Anna Julia Keay, 
(born August 1974 in the West Highlands of Scotland), is a British architectural historian, author and television personality and director of The Landmark Trust since 2012.

Early life and education
Keay grew up in a remote home in the West Highlands, the daughter of authors John Keay and Julia Keay. She was the granddaughter of Conservative politician and former chief whip Humphrey Atkins.

She was educated at Oban High School in Argyll and Bedales School.  She then read history at Magdalen College in Oxford.

She then studied for a PhD at Queen Mary, University of London; her thesis The ceremonies of Charles II's court was completed in 2004.

Career
Keay worked for English Heritage from 2002–2012, including seven years as Assistant Curator of the Historic Royal Palaces, responsible for Hampton Court, the Banqueting House, Whitehall, and the Tower of London. As its Director of Properties Presentation, she was involved in the restoration of the Elizabethan Garden at Kenilworth Castle, which featured in a 2009 BBC television series about English Heritage.

She has served as director of The Landmark Trust since 2012.

She appeared on BBC Radio 4's The Museum of Curiosity in October 2014. Her hypothetical donation to this fictional museum was the St Edward's Crown, part of the British Crown Jewels. She co-presented The Buildings That Made Britain on Channel 5.

Keay is Trustee of the Royal Collection Trust.

Private life
Keay married fellow historian Simon Thurley in 2008. The couple have fraternal twins, Arthur and Maude, born in 2009.  They live in London and Norfolk.

Awards and honours
 Keay was appointed Officer of the Order of the British Empire (OBE) in the 2019 Birthday Honours for services to heritage.
 Shortlisted for the 2022 Baillie Gifford Prize for The Restless Republic.

Selected publications

The Earl of Essex: The Life and Death of a Tudor Traitor (2001, Historic Royal Palaces)
The Magnificent Monarch: Charles II and the Ceremonies of Power (2008, Bloomsbury)
The Crown Jewels: The Official Illustrated History (2012, Thames & Hudson)
The Elizabethan Garden at Kenilworth Castle (2013, English Heritage)
The Last Royal Rebel: The Life and Death of James, Duke of Monmouth (2017, Bloomsbury)
The Restless Republic: Britain without a crown (2022, William Collins)

References

External links

Clifton House — private home of Dr Anna Keay and Dr Simon Thurley, occasionally open to the public

1974 births
Living people
British women historians
British architectural historians
People educated at Oban High School
Officers of the Order of the British Empire